Inside Out is the second studio album by Rock Star: Supernova runner-up Dilana. It was released via digital distribution on November 17, 2009.

Development
"Inside Out," originally entitled "Darklight," was recorded in Los Angeles and features No Doubt drummer Adrian Young, Mötley Crüe guitarist Mick Mars and producer Dave Bassett. Although Dilana signed a contract with London-based Hurricane Records (Hurricane Music Group Ltd) in early 2008  and was finished with recording her new album already in mid-2008, it was not released by said record company. In a later update from Dilana on hardrockhideout.com  she announced that not only did she get released from her contract with HMG due to the label's shutdown but also that the master recordings did not belong to her. Dilana then went into negotiations with Kabunk Records, LLC.  Although Dilana was unable to sign a deal with Kabunk, the label did purchase the rights to the Inside Out album and will be releasing the album digitally.

Critical reception

Reception of the album has been, initially, very positive. Albert Watson, from Metromix music, writes,

Singles

Track listing
Holiday - 3:43
My Drug - 2:55
Hate U - 3:59
Loud Silence - 3:44
Somebody Else - 4:16
Ice - 4:26
Solid Gold - 4:09
Dirty Little Secret - 3:44
World Party (Free Love) - 3:29
Falling Apart - 4:02
Still Wanting - 3:48
The Question - 7:35

References

Dilana albums
2009 albums